The Pledge of Allegiance of the United States is an expression of allegiance to the flag of the United States and the republic of the United States of America.

Pledge of Allegiance may also refer to:

 Pledge of Allegiance (The Bahamas)
 Pledge of Allegiance (South Korea)
 Pledge of Allegiance to the Mexican Flag
 Pledge of Allegiance to the Philippine Flag
 "Pledge of Allegiance", an episode of NCIS (season 19)
  "Pledge of Allegiance" (song), by DJ Drama
 Pledge of Allegiance building, or Youth's Companion Building, in Boston, Massachusetts, U.S.

See also
 In God We Trust (disambiguation)
 One Nation Under God (disambiguation)
 Pledge of Allegiance Tour: Live Concert Recording, a live album by System of a Down, Slipknot, Mudvayne, American Head Charge and No One
 Oath of allegiance